Boria Kamalpur is a village in Rewari mandal of Jatusana Block, in the Indian state of Haryana. It is also named as Bodia Kamal Pur

Demographics
As of 2011 India census, Boria Kamalpur had a population of 2057 in 426 households. Males (1086) constitute 52.79%  of the population and females (971) 47.20%. Budhpur has an average literacy rate(1504) of 73.11%, lower than the national average of 74%: male literacy (884) is 58.77%, and female (620) literacy is 41.22%. In Boria Kamalpur, 10.64% of the population is under 6 years of age(219) .

Adjacent Villages
Budhpur
Rasooli

References

Villages in Rewari district